Phil Cheetham (born 26 October 1954) is an Australian gymnast. He competed in seven events at the 1976 Summer Olympics.

References

1954 births
Living people
Australian male artistic gymnasts
Olympic gymnasts of Australia
Gymnasts at the 1976 Summer Olympics
Place of birth missing (living people)